{{DISPLAYTITLE:C15H11ClN2O}}
The molecular formula C15H11ClN2O (molar mass: 270.71 g/mol, exact mass: 270.0560 u) may refer to:

 Mecloqualone
 Nordazepam

Molecular formulas